Saša Marković (born 17 September 1971) is a Serbian former professional footballer who played as a striker. He led the First League of FR Yugoslavia in scoring during the 1997–98 season and is one of the league's all-time leading scorers. Marković also had two unassuming spells abroad, in Germany and Hungary.

Career
Marković made his First League of FR Yugoslavia debut with Jastrebac Niš in the 1993–94 season, as the club suffered relegation to the Second League. He later moved to Čukarički and scored 13 goals in the 1995–96 First League of FR Yugoslavia. During the 1997 winter transfer window, Marković switched to fellow First League side Železnik and netted 10 goals in the remainder of the 1996–97 campaign.

After bagging 13 goals for Železnik in the first half of the 1997–98 First League of FR Yugoslavia, Marković was transferred to Red Star Belgrade. He continued his scoring form in the second half of the season, netting 14 more times and becoming the league's top scorer with 27 goals in total.

In the summer of 1998, Marković was sold to Germany's VfB Stuttgart. He appeared in four games and scored once in his debut season. In the summer of 2000, Marković rejoined his former club Železnik. He managed to quickly refound his form, tallying 18 goals in the 2000–01 season. In early 2002, Marković moved abroad for the second time and signed with Hungarian side MTK Hungária.

In the summer of 2003, Marković joined his hometown club Radnički Niš and played in the Second League of Serbia and Montenegro. He later spent some time with fellow Second League side OFK Niš and also Železničar Niš in the Serbian League East. During the 2006 winter transfer window, Marković returned to Radnički Niš.

Honours
 First League of FR Yugoslavia Top Scorer: 1997–98

References

External links
 
 

Association football forwards
Bundesliga players
Expatriate footballers in Germany
Expatriate footballers in Hungary
First League of Serbia and Montenegro players
FK Čukarički players
FK Radnički Niš players
FK Železnik players
MTK Budapest FC players
Nemzeti Bajnokság I players
OFK Niš players
Red Star Belgrade footballers
Serbia and Montenegro expatriate footballers
Serbia and Montenegro expatriate sportspeople in Germany
Serbia and Montenegro expatriate sportspeople in Hungary
Serbia and Montenegro footballers
Serbian footballers
Sportspeople from Niš
VfB Stuttgart players
1971 births
Living people